Helen Thomson is an Australian actress. Thomson's credits include the television shows Bad Mothers, Stupid Stupid Man and Blue Heelers and the films Gettin' Square, A Man's Gotta Do and La Spagnola. Thomson has multiple stage credits with the Sydney Theatre Company and Melbourne Theatre Company. She has been a frequent collaborator with her husband David Roberts.

Thomson is also known for her role as Gladys Presley in the biographical film Elvis (2022).

Filmography

Film

Television

References

External links

21st-century Australian actresses
Living people
Year of birth missing (living people)